The Earlham Community School District is a rural public school district headquartered in Earlham, Iowa.

The district is mostly in Madison County, but also has an area portions in Dallas County. The district serves Earlham and the surrounding rural areas.

Michael Wright has served as superintendent since 2007, after serving in the same role for Clear Lake Community School District for two years.

Schools
The district has three schools on a single campus in Earlham.
Earlham Elementary School
Earlham Middle School
Earlham Senior High School

Earlham High School

Athletics
The Cardinals compete in the West Central Activities Conference in the following sports:
Cross Country
Volleyball
Football
Basketball
Wrestling
Track and Field
Golf 
Baseball
Softball
 2-time State Champions (2009, 2014)

Students from Earlham can also participate in the following sports as part of the teams from Winterset:
Bowling
Soccer
Swimming

See also
List of school districts in Iowa
List of high schools in Iowa

References

External links
 Earlham Community School District

School districts in Iowa
Education in Madison County, Iowa
Education in Dallas County, Iowa